BF5 may refer to:

 Ben Folds Five, an American alternative rock band
 Battlefield V, video game by EA DICE
 Hot Wheels Battle Force 5, a Canadian-American CGI series